Billtown is an unincorporated community in Posey Township, Clay County, Indiana. It is part of the Terre Haute Metropolitan Statistical Area.

History
Billtown was originally known as Williamstown, and under the latter name was platted in 1831.

Billtown once contained a post office under the name Van Buren. The Van Buren post office operated from 1835 until 1865.

Geography

References

Unincorporated communities in Clay County, Indiana
Unincorporated communities in Indiana
Terre Haute metropolitan area